Utah Department of Public Safety (DPS) is a law enforcement agency in the State of Utah, headquartered in Taylorsville.

Utah Department of Public Safety is under the direction of Commissioner Jess L. Anderson.

The agency is headquartered at South 4501 South 2700 West in Taylorsville.

Senior Staff

Divisions
The Department of Public Safety has 11 divisions and bureaus:

Utah Division of Emergency Management
Utah State Fire Marshal's Office
Utah Highway Patrol
Utah Driver License Division
Utah Statewide Information and Analysis Center (SIAC)
Utah State Bureau of Investigation (SBI)
Utah State Communications
Utah State State Crime Lab
Highway Safety
Bureau of Criminal Identification
Peace Officer Standards and Training (POST)

References

External links

 Utah Department of Public Safety

State law enforcement agencies of Utah
Public safety